Flensburger Brauerei is a brewery located in Flensburg in the Bundesland (federal state) of Schleswig-Holstein, Germany. It is one of the last country-wide operating breweries not being part of a larger brewery group. The company was founded on September 6, 1888, by five citizens of Flensburg. Today it is still mainly held by the founder families Petersen and Dethleffsen.

Production

Before modern refrigeration, the brewery used to chop blocks of ice from frozen lakes in the winter and bring the blocks back to the brewery to keep their underground storage facilities cool in summer. The brewery still operates its own water well, which is supplied from an underground vein of very old Ice Age melt water coming from Scandinavia.

The company has about 120 employees (as of 2008) and is known for running technically advanced and highly automated production processes.

Products

All Flensburger products are bottled in glass bottles with a traditional flip-top (swing-top) closure. This demands several complicated mechanisms for large-scale production, bottle cleaning and recycling processes.

The range of beers and other products includes the following.

Beers
 Flensburger Pilsener – North German variation of the pilsener style with 4.8% abv
 Flensburger Gold – Another Pilsener (similar to lager style) with 4.8% abv
 Flensburger Dunkel – Dunkel style with 4.8% abv
 Flensburger Weizen – Unfiltered wheat beer with 5.1% abv
 Flensburger Kellerbier – Unfiltered kellerbier style with 4.8% abv
 Flensburger Edles Helles – A helles beer marketed as 125th anniversary brew

Seasonal types
 Flensburger Winterbock – Seasonally available dark bock with 7.0% abv
 Flensburger Frühlingsbock – Seasonally available dark bock with 6.9% abv

Non-alcoholic
 Flensburger Frei – Non-alcoholic helles style
 Flensburger Malz – Non-alcoholic malt beer

Shandy style drinks
 Flensburger Radler – Shandy style with 2.4% abv
 Flensburger Biermix "Lemongrass" – beer and lemonade mix with 2.4% abv
 Flensburger Biermix "Blutorange-Grapefruit" – beer and lemonade mix with 2.4% abv

Soft drinks
 Flensburger Wasser – Mineral water in the typical swing-top bottle
 Flensburger Fassbrause – A Fassbrause soft drink

In popular culture

 Local people usual call Flensburger beers a “Flens” when ordering one. The flip-top stopper makes a "plopp" sound when opening, which has become part of the corporate identity. 
 Since running a marketing campaign emphasizing the stereotype of the stoic, blunt and ironic North German mentality the Flens brand has become a symbol of self-identification for the region.
 Being sited next to the campus the annual visit of the brewery has become a traditional event for the process engineering students of Flensburg.
 Once being a regional beer with its distribution centered mainly in Schleswig-Holstein, Flensburger became popular all over Germany with the "Werner"-comics by Rötger Feldmann (aka Brösel or Werner Brösel) in the 1980s.
 Former US Secretary of State Colin Powell became a fan of Flensburger Pilsener after his German colleague Joschka Fischer gave him a crate of Flens as a gift during one of Powell's official visits to Germany. Fischer would continue to occasionally send Powell crates to the US throughout his tenure in office.

References

External links
 Flensburger Brauerei Homepage

Breweries in Germany
Beer brands of Germany
Buildings and structures in Flensburg